The  Windows Phone 8S by HTC was announced by HTC Corporation on September 19, 2012 and released on December 7, 2012 in Canada. It is a cheaper, lower-end version of the Windows Phone 8X by HTC. Despite its availability in Canada, HTC announced that the 8S will not be sold in the United States because the company plans to focus instead on the 8X, which is considered its signature phone on the Windows operating system.

Because of the limited memory available on this phone, certain applications and features will not be able to run.

Availability 
In Canada, the HTC 8S was first available released for Virgin Mobile Canada on December 7, 2012.  HTC plans to make the 8S available at Koodo Mobile, Mobilicity and Wind Mobile in 2013.

Reception 
One week after launching the device, Virgin Mobile Canada reported that the phone has been "flying off the shelves".  At that time, the Mobile Syrup blog stated that the 8S was "the best deal on a no-contract phone at the moment"   The blog also praised the device's size and design, and claimed that the phone "makes a number of compromises […] but it’s still able to perform […] well".

Ewan Spence from All About Windows Phone wrote: "While there are clear use cases for the 8S (and I can think of a few people in my family that would get by easily with the 8S) it feels like a missed opportunity. It's going to fall seriously short with anyone who is looking to really push the Windows Phone 8 platform."

OS updates 
The HTC Windows Phone 8S has received the Windows Phone 8.1 update, but has not been updated officially further to Windows Phone 8.1 Update 1 (however, the latest 8.1 updates can be obtained via Microsoft's "Preview for Developers" app), despite its relatively better counterpart, the Windows Phone 8X, having received this latest update. As such, it has become highly unlikely that there will an update to Windows 10 Mobile for the 8S.

See also
 HTC
 HTC Windows Phone 8X
 Windows Phone 8

References

External links
 

Windows Phone devices
Mobile phones introduced in 2012
Videotelephony
Discontinued smartphones
HTC smartphones